AOTF may refer to:
 Acousto-optic tunable filter, a piezoelectric optical device
 American Occupational Therapy Foundation, a non-profit charitable, scientific and educational organization.
 Admiral of the Fleet, the highest rank in the British Royal Navy
AotF may refer to:
 The Age of the Fall (AF), a wrestling stable
 Army Of The Pharaohs (AP) - American hip-hop group

Acousto-optics#Acousto-optic_tunable_filter